The following are statistics of Mexico's Primera División for the 1996–97 season.

Overview

Teams

Torneo Invierno 1996
Primera División de México (Mexican First Division) Invierno 1996 is a Mexican football tournament - one of two short tournaments that take up the entire year to determine the champion(s) of Mexican football. It began on Friday, August 9, 1996, and ran until November 24, when the regular season ended. In the final Santos defeated Necaxa and became champions for the 1st time.

Final standings (groups)

League table

Results

Top goalscorers 
Players sorted first by goals scored, then by last name. Only regular season goals listed.

Source: MedioTiempo

Playoffs

Repechage

Toros Neza won 4–2 on aggregate.

Atlas won 6–3 on aggregate.

Bracket

Quarterfinals

Toros Neza won 9–2 on aggregate.

Santos Laguna won 4–2 on aggregate.

Necaxa won 3–2 on aggregate.

Puebla won 2–1 on aggregate.

Semifinals

Santos Laguna won 5–2 on aggregate.

Necaxa won 7–3 on aggregate.

Finals
First leg

Second leg

Santos Laguna won 4–3 on aggregate.

Torneo Verano 1997
Primera División de México (Mexican First Division) Verano 1997 is a Mexican football tournament - one of two short tournaments that take up the entire year to determine the champion(s) of Mexican football. It began on Saturday, January 11, 1997, and ran until May 4, when the regular season ended. In the final Guadalajara defeated Toros Neza and became champions for the 10th time.

Final standings (groups)

League table

Results

Top goalscorers
Players sorted first by goals scored, then by last name. Only regular season goals listed.

Source: MedioTiempo

Playoffs

Repechage

Morelia won 4–2 on aggregate.

Bracket

Quarterfinals

Guadalajara won 6–1 on aggregate.

Atlético Morelia won 4–1 on aggregate.

Toros Neza won 4–3 on aggregate.

3–3 on aggregate. Necaxa advanced for being the higher seeded team.

Semifinals

1–1 on aggregate. Guadalajara advanced for being the higher seeded team.

Toros Neza won 4–3 on aggregate.

Finals
First leg

Second leg

Guadalajara won 7–2 on aggregate.

Relegation table

References

External links
 Mediotiempo.com (where information was obtained)

 
Liga MX seasons
Mex
1996–97 in Mexican football